Tina Arena is an Australian singer-songwriter, musician, musical theatre actress and record producer. Tina Arena appeared as a child performer on the national television talent show Young Talent Time in 1976, at age 8 before branching out into a successful solo career.

Awards and nominations

ALMA Awards
The ALMA Awards, (formerly known as Latin Oscars Award), is an award highlighting the best American Latino contributions to music, television, and film. The awards promote fair and accurate portrayals of Latinos. In Spanish and Portuguese the word alma means "soul."

! 
|-
|rowspan="2" |  1999
|rowspan="2" |  "I Want to Spend My Life Time Loving You" (with Marc Antony)
| ALMA Award for Outstanding Performance of a Song for a Feature Film
| 
|rowspan="2" | 
|-
| ALMA Award for Outstanding Music Video
| 
|-

APRA Awards
The APRA Awards are held in Australia and New Zealand by the Australasian Performing Right Association to recognise songwriting skills, sales and airplay performance by its members annually.

! 
|-
|rowspan="2" | 1996
|rowspan="2" | "Wasn't It Good" (Tina Arena, Robert Parde, Heather Field)
| Song of the Year
| 
|rowspan="2" | 
|-
| Most Performed Song of the Year
| 
|-
| 1999
| "Now I Can Dance" (Tina Arena, David Tyson)
| Most Performed Song of the Year
| 
| 
|-

ARIA Music Awards

The ARIA Music Awards is an annual awards ceremony that recognises excellence, innovation, and achievement across all genres of Australian music. They commenced in 1987.

! 
|-
| 1991 || Doug Brady for "Strong as Steel", "I Need Your Body", "The Machine's Breaking Down" || Engineer of the Year  ||  || 
|-
|rowspan="6" | 1995 ||rowspan="3" | Don't Ask  || Best Female Artist  ||  ||rowspan="6" | 
|-
|  Album of the Year || 
|-
|  Highest Selling Album || 
|-
|rowspan="3" | "Chains" || Best Pop Release || 
|-
|  Song of the Year || 
|-
|  Single of the Year || 
|-
|rowspan="5" | 1996 || Don't Ask  || Highest Selling Album  ||  ||rowspan="5" | 
|-
|rowspan="4" | "Wasn't It Good" || Single of the Year || 
|-
| Best Female Artist || 
|-
| Best Pop Release || 
|-
| Song of the Year || 
|-
|rowspan="3" | 1998 ||rowspan="2" | In Deep || Highest Selling Album  ||  ||rowspan="3" | 
|-
| Best Female Artist || 
|-
| "Burn" || Highest Selling Single || 
|-
| 2000 || Tina Arena || ARIA Award for Outstanding Achievement  ||  || 
|-
| 2008 || Songs of Love and Lose || Highest Selling Album ||  || 
|-
| 2013 || Symphony of Life || Best Original Soundtrack, Cast or Show Album ||  || 
|-
| 2014 || Reset || Best Adult Contemporary Album ||  || 
|-
| 2015 || Tina Arena || ARIA Hall of Fame ||  || 
|-
| 2016 || Eleven || Best Adult Contemporary Album ||  || 
|-
| 2017 || Tim White for Client Liaison (featuring Tina Arena) -  "A Foreign Affair" || Best Video ||  || 
|-
|}

Brit Awards
The BRIT Awards (often simply called the BRITs) are the British Phonographic Industry's annual popular music awards.

! 
|-
| 1996
| Tina Arena
| Brit Award for International Breakthrough Act
| 
| 
|-

Helpmann Awards
The Helpmann Awards is an awards show, celebrating live entertainment and performing arts in Australia, presented by industry group Live Live Performance Australia (LPA) since 2001.

 
! 
|-
| 2008
| Tina Arena
| Helpmann Award for Best Performance in an Australian Contemporary Concert
| 
| 
|-
| 2015
| Reset Tour
| Best Australian Contemporary Concert
| 
| 
|-
| 2019
| Tina Arena in Evita
| Helpmann Award for Best Female Actor in a Musical
| 
| 
|-

J Awards
The J Awards are an annual series of Australian music awards that were established by the Australian Broadcasting Corporation's youth-focused radio station Triple J. They commenced in 2005.

! 
|-
| 2017
| "A Foreign Affair" (Client Liaison with Tina Arena)
| Australian Video of the Year
| 
| 
|-

La Chanson de l'année
La Chanson de l'année (translated as "Song of the Year" in English) is a ceremony of awards which takes place every year in France. 
 
! 
|-
|2006
|"Aimer Jusqu'a L'impossible"
|Song of the Year
|
|
|}

Mo Awards
The Australian Entertainment Mo Awards (commonly known informally as the Mo Awards), were annual Australian entertainment industry awards. They recognise achievements in live entertainment in Australia from 1975 to 2016. Tina Arena won two awards in that time.
 (wins only)
! 
|-
|rowspan="2"| 1995
| Tina Arena
| Rock Performer of the Year
| 
|rowspan="2"| 
|-
| Tina Arena
| Australian Performer of the Year
| 
|-

NRJ Music Award
The NRJ Music Award (commonly abbreviated as an NMA) is an award presented by the French radio station NRJ to honor the best in the French and worldwide music industry. They commenced in 2000.

 (wins only)
! 
|-
| 2000
| Tina Arena
| International Breakthrough  of the Year
| 
| 
|-

Order of Australia
The Order of Australia is an honour that recognises Australian citizens and other persons for outstanding achievement and service.
 
! 
|-
|2016
|Tina Arena
|Member of the Order of Australia (AM)
|
|
|}

Ordre national du Mérite 
The Ordre national du Mérite is a French order of merit with membership awarded by the President of the French Republic, founded on 3 December 1963 by President Charles de Gaulle.
 
! 
|-
|2009
|Tina Arena
|Knight
|
|
|}

People's Choice Awards
The People's Choice Awards (Australia) was an Australian version of the American awards show of the same name. It ran in 1998 and 1999. The awards recognised works of popular culture and people active in it. Winners were chosen by popular vote.

! 
|-
| 1998
| Tina Arena
| Favourite Australian Singer (female)
| 
|  
|-

Support Act 
 
! 
|-
|2019
|Tina Arena
|Excellence in Community Award
|
|
|}

World Music Awards
The World Music Awards was an international award show founded in 1989 under the patronage of Albert II, Prince of Monaco and  co-founder/executive producer John Martinotti. The event is based in Monte Carlo. It ran from 1989 to 2008, 2010 and 2014.
 (wins only)

! 
|-
| 1996
| Tina Arena
| World Music Award for World's Best Selling Australian Artist
| 
|rowspan="2"| 
|-
| 2000
| Tina Arena
| World Music Award for World's Best Selling Australian Artist
| 
|-

References 

 
Arena, Tina